San Agustín Amatengo  is a town and municipality in Oaxaca in south-western Mexico. The municipality covers an area of 58.69 km². It is part of the Ejutla District in the south of the Valles Centrales Region.

In 2005, the municipality had a total population of 1,455.

References

Municipalities of Oaxaca